Ewa Małas-Godlewska (born 23 January 1957) is a Polish lyric coloratura soprano, residing in France. An accomplished opera singer, she graduated from the Wroclaw PWSM, being noted for her unique interpretation of Baroque music.

She contributed her voice for the soundtrack of the 1994 film Farinelli, where she identified herself as Ewa Malas-Godlewska. Her voice was electronically blended with that of countertenor Derek Lee Ragin to recreate the famous castrato's voice. The only non-blended recording of Malas-Godlewska on the Farinelli soundtrack is the aria Lascia ch'io pianga by George Frideric Handel.

Discography

References

External links

Oficjalna Lista Spazedazy
Oficjalna Lista Spazedazy
 

1957 births
Living people
Polish operatic sopranos
21st-century Polish women opera singers
20th-century Polish women opera singers